The Mask is a 1995 side-scrolling action video game created by American studio Black Pearl Software for the Super Nintendo Entertainment System which is based on the film of the same name. The film, in turn, was loosely based on the Dark Horse comic book series of the same name.

The game received moderately positive reviews from critics, who were particularly pleased with its faithful recreation of the humor and visual style of the film, while criticizing the level design and difficulty.

Story 
Dorian Tyrell and his gang of rogues are secretly planning to take over Edge City, a small and prosperous city where the nightlife revolves around the wealthy patrons who attend the nightclub that Dorian owns and operates for the benefit of himself and his henchmen.
Stanley Ipkiss, a mild mannered bank clerk  who is unlucky and bullied transforms into the namesake character after discovering a green Loki mask. The Mask and Stanley must stop Dorian Tyrell and his plan, and save Tina Carlyle the woman that they both love.

Gameplay 

The player has to navigate through Ipkiss' apartment, a high-rent district, outside and inside the bank, the local park, inside the local prison (complete with enemies wearing stereotypical striped prison uniforms), and finally through a ritzy nightclub to fight his evil nemesis, Dorian (who is also wearing the mask). All the major bosses in the game resemble characters from the film like Mrs. Peenman, the angry landlady, along with careless repairmen Irv and Burt Ripley, who repaired Ipkiss' vehicle.

If the player runs out of health, then he returns to being Ipkiss, wearing his pajamas. Many of The Mask's moves featured in the game were based on scenes in the movie, such as the mallet (in which he uses to smash the alarm clock from the first movie), the tornado, the massive guns he pulls from his pocket during the final confrontation during the first movie, and the huge "living" horn. It also features other moves, such as a sneaking move which makes The Mask invisible (his enemies do not see him), a dash move (as well as a "superdash" move where he runs at supersonic speed), and his primary attack which is a basic punch move with cartoon boxing gloves. Many of those special moves (the mallet, guns, horn, etc.) use The Mask's "Morph" power, which are replenished by power-ups. If his morph meter runs out it slowly replenishes to a smaller amount than that he started out with, much like the ammo replenishes for the main gun in Earthworm Jim.

The ending of the video game involves dancing with a 16-bit representation of Cameron Diaz accompanied by big band music. Cameron Diaz's breakthrough role was as   Tina Carlyle (Dorian Tyrell's girlfriend) in the actual film.

Development 
Though the game is ostensibly based on the movie, the graphics were based on the cartoony style of the comic book rather than the movie. The game took longer to develop than anticipated, not being released until over a year after the movie's theatrical release.

The beta version of The Mask played more like a beat 'em up rather than a side-scrolling action game. Damage in the beta version came in a series of expressions, similar to the various faces used in the 1993 first-person shooter Doom. Different backgrounds were placed in the incomplete version that were scrapped in the retail version. Violent-looking attacks like a projectile-firing gun and a karate-style low kick were deleted from the final version.

A version of the game was also in development for the Sega Genesis but was canceled. According to a spokesperson, due to the Super NES version taking longer than expected, the Genesis version would not have been completed until two years after the film appeared in theaters, too late to significantly benefit from the license, and was cancelled because of this.

In one speedrun of the game, designer Matt Harmon said that a carnival-themed level was scrapped from the game. In the stage select screen, there exists an unused level called "Wild Ride", and it is possible that this is that level.

Reception 

The four reviewers of Electronic Gaming Monthly praised the variety of abilities, the faithfulness to the humor and style of the source material, and the graphics, especially the animation, while criticizing the levels as overly large, to the point of being repetitious and easy to get lost in. GamePro similarly applauded the game for its heavy use of characters and visual gags from the film, as well as the Mask's many abilities, but said that the graphics of enemies and backgrounds "are closer to '93 standards than '95 potential." They summarized that "Carrey's wild character is still fresh, and solid gameplay makes this lightweight adventure a fun trip." A reviewer for Next Generation was most enthusiastic about the fluid, cartoonish animation and the secret ways of using the backgrounds to move around the level. He was more forgiving of the level design than EGM, commenting that "while the level mazes are, at times, too convoluted for their own good, they're certainly inventive." He gave it three out of five stars, concluding that "The title could have used some difficulty tweaking, and it lacks any sort of save or continue feature, but overall it's a solid, enjoyable surprise."

References

External links 
 

1995 video games
Cancelled Game Boy Color games
Cancelled Sega Genesis games
Side-scrolling video games
Single-player video games
Super Nintendo Entertainment System games
Super Nintendo Entertainment System-only games
Superhero video games
Video games based on Dark Horse Comics films
Video games set in the 1990s
Video games set in the United States
Video games developed in the United States
Virgin Interactive games
Video games based on films
The Mask (franchise)
Black Pearl Software games